Jóladagatal Sjónvarpsins is an ongoing Icelandic Christmas calendar television series, produced by public television channel Sjónvarpið.

List of series
There was no Christmas calendar broadcast in 1989.

References

1990s Icelandic television series
1990 Icelandic television series debuts
2000s Icelandic television series
2010s Icelandic television series